Passiflora coriacea, commonly known as the wild sweet calabash or bat leaved passion flower,  is a tropical vine with very distinct leaves in the shape of bats' wings. It also has purple oval or circle shaped fruit that are mainly ornamental. It is a fast-growing vine to several feet. Leaves are dark green and often with splotches of light-green. White-yellow flowers with the typically ornate Passiflora appearance form when weather is warm.

coriacea